Usman is a town and the administrative center of Usmansky District in Lipetsk Oblast, Russia, located on the Usman River,  south of Lipetsk, the administrative center of the oblast. Population:

History
Founded in 1645, it was first an ostrog (fortress) on the Belgorod Line and named after the Usman River. In 1652, it was raided by the Tatars. It was granted town status in 1779.

Administrative and municipal status
Within the framework of administrative divisions, Usman serves as the administrative center of Usmansky District. As an administrative division, it is incorporated within Usmansky District as Usman Town Under District Jurisdiction. As a municipal division, Usman Town Under District Jurisdiction is incorporated within Usmansky Municipal District as Usman Urban Settlement.

Notable facts 

 The minor planet 16515 Usmanʹgrad was named after the town.
 Usman was the birthplace of:
 Nikolay Basov (1922–2001), co-recipient of the 1964 Nobel Prize in Physics
 Astronomer Nikolai Chernykh (1931–2004), a discoverer of minor planets
 Pyotr Nikolsky (1858–1940), a dermatologist

References

Sources 
 
 

Cities and towns in Lipetsk Oblast
Usmansky Uyezd